Charles Kirk may refer to:

Charles Kirk (architect) (1791–1847), English builder
Charlie Kirk (born 1993), American political activist, founder of Turning Point USA
Charlie Kirk (footballer) (born 1997), English footballer for Crewe Alexandra F.C.